John Fox,  (1924 – 2001) was a Canadian civil engineer. He oversaw the Mount Macdonald Tunnel project at Rogers Pass in the Canadian Rockies, the crowning achievement of a 40-year career at Canadian Pacific Railway. The innovative 1.2 km John Fox Viaduct, just to the east of the Mount Shaughnessy Tunnel eastern portal is named after him.

Early life
Son of James Fox who came from England and operated a store in Huntingdon, Quebec, John Fox attended Huntingdon Academy and later joined the Royal Canadian Air Force as a pilot in World War II. After the war, he studied Civil Engineering at McGill University and married the former Janet Fraser of Dundee, Quebec in 1949, the same year that he joined the CPR.

Legacy
John Fox was appointed to the Order of Canada on October 25, 1990, with the following citation: "Vice-President of Engineering and Special Projects at Canadian Pacific Rail, he was responsible for introducing innovative and environmentally-sensitive engineering techniques in the construction of the Roger's Pass Project, the single most important railway project since the building of the main line. His leadership and professionalism have facilitated the enhancement of the safety and efficiency of Canada's railway system".

References

External links
CPR tunnel builder John Fox dies at 77, Toronto Globe and Mail, Published Tuesday, Apr. 17, 2001
A Calgary stampede toward a rail tunnel, The Christian Science Monitor March 19, 1987
The Rogers Pass Project

Canadian civil engineers
Members of the Order of Canada
Canadian people in rail transport
People from Pierrefonds-Roxboro
1924 births
2001 deaths
McGill University Faculty of Engineering alumni